Old Georgian (ႤႬႠჂ ႵႠႰႧႭჃႪႨ, enay kartuli) was a literary language of the Georgian monarchies attested from the 5th century. The language remains in use as the liturgical language of the Georgian Orthodox Church and for the most part is still intelligible. Spoken Old Georgian gave way to what is classified as Middle Georgian in the 11th century, which in turn developed into the modern Georgian language in the 18th century.

Periodization
Two periods are distinguished within Old Georgian: Early Old Georgian (5th to 8th centuries) and Classical Old Georgian (9th to 11th centuries). Two different dialects are represented in Early Old Georgian, known as Khanmet’i (ხანმეტი, 5th to 7th c.) and Haemet’i (ჰაემეტი, 7th and 8th c.). They are so named after the presence of a second person subject prefix and a third person object prefix kh- or h- in the verbal morphology where Classical Old Georgian has h-, s- or zero.

Texts
The corpus of Early Old Georgian texts is limited in size, consisting of a dozen inscriptions and eight manuscripts containing religious texts. The literature in Classical Old Georgian has a wider scope, including philosophical and historiographical works.

Phoneme inventory
Old Georgian had 29 phonemic consonants and 5 phonemic vowels. The native spelling also distinguishes the semivowel y, which is an allophone of the vowel i in postvocalic position.

The table shows the consonants in the National Transliteration System (2002). This system leaves aspiration unmarked, and marks glottalization with an apostrophe. International Phonetic Alphabet equivalents are included in square brackets when different.

Script

Old Georgian was written in its own alphabetic script, known as Asomtavruli "capital letters" or Mrglovani "rounded". The alphabet is very nearly phonemic, showing an excellent "fit" between phonemes and graphemes. It is clearly modelled on the Greek alphabet, showing basically the same alphabetic order, and with letters representing non-Greek phonemes gathered at the end. Apart from letters for nearly all Georgian phonemes, the alphabet also contains three letters representing Greek phonemes not found in Georgian (ē, ü and ō). Most individual letters seem to be entirely independent designs, with only a few based directly on their Greek counterparts (cf. Greek Φ Θ Χ [pʰ tʰ kʰ], Asomtavruli Ⴔ Ⴇ Ⴕ).

Orthography
Old Georgian orthography is quite consistent, in the sense that the same word is usually written in the same way in all instances. Spelling is nearly phonemic, with almost all phonemes exclusively represented by a single letter. The exceptions are described below.

Vowel u
The most conspicuous exception to the rule that each phoneme is written with its own letter is the vowel u, which is consistently written with the digraph ႭჃ , for example ႮႭჃႰႨ  p’uri "bread". In the later Nuskhuri script, the original digraph ⴍⴣ  merged into a single letter ⴓ  (modern Mkhedruli script უ). A matching Asomtavruli single-letter counterpart Ⴓ was then devised; this letter was not part of the original alphabet, and was not used in the Old Georgian period.

 Semivowel w
The semivowel w is written in two ways, depending on its position within the word. When it occurs directly after a consonant, it is written with the digraph ႭჃ , for example ႹႭჃႤႬ  chwen "we", ႢႭჃႰႨႲႨ  gwrit’i "turtledove". The digraph ႭჃ  thus represents both w and u, without differentiation in the spelling, for example ႵႭჃႧႨ   "five" vs. ႤႵႭჃႱႨ   "six".

In all other positions, w is written with the letter Ⴅ , for example ႧႭႥႪႨ   "snow", ႥႤႪႨ  weli "field", ႩႠႰႠႥႨ  k’arawi "tent".

Semivowel y
The initial vowel i- of a case suffix is realized as y- after a vowel, and this allophonic y has its own letter in the alphabet, for example ႣႤႣႠჂ ႨႤႱႭჃჂႱႠ  deda-y iesu-ysa , phonemically  (mother-NOM Jesus-GEN) "the mother of Jesus".

The "Greek" letters
The Asomtavruli alphabet contains three letters which are not needed for the writing of native words: Ⴡ , Ⴣ  and Ⴥ . These were added to the alphabet in order to make possible a letter-for-letter transliteration of Greek names and loanwords. They were indeed occasionally used to write the Greek vowels ē (ēta), ü (ypsilon) and ō (ōmega). As these vowels are alien to Georgian, they were replaced in actual pronunciation by ey, wi and ow respectively, as can be deduced from old variant spellings, and from corresponding modern forms. For example, Greek Αἴγυπτος is written ႤႢჃႮႲႤ  egwip’t’e "Egypt" (cf. modern Georgian ეგვიპტე egvip’t’e).

In native words, the letter Ⴥ  was mainly used to write the vocative particle, for example Ⴥ ႣႤႣႨႩႠႺႭ  o dedik’atso "o woman!"

The letters Ⴡ  and Ⴣ  on the other hand were frequently used in the spelling of native words, as a short-hand way of representing the sequences ey and wi, for example ႫႤႴჁ   "king", ႶჃႬႭჂ  ghwinoy "wine". Spelling can thus vary within a paradigm, for example ႱႨႲႷႭჃႠჂ  sit’q’wa-y "word" (nominative case) vs. ႱႨႲႷჃႱႠ  sit’q’w-isa (genitive). The sequences ey and wi could also be written out in full however, for example ႫႤႴႤჂ  , ႶႭჃႨႬႭჂ   "wine" (also ႶჃႨႬႭჂ , a mixed spelling).

Notes and references

Cited works

External links
Грамматика древнелитературного грузинского языка  by Nicholas Marr Digital Library of Russian Academy of Sciences
Grammatik zur altgeorgischen Bibelübersetzung by Franz Zorell  Digital Library of Marthin Luther University 

Georgian language
Kartvelian languages
Languages of Georgia (country)
Georgian
Languages attested from the 5th century
Georgian-Zan languages